Following is a List of 2010–11 Israeli football winter transfers, in the 2011 winter transfer window by each club, both in the Israeli Premier League and the second-tier Liga Leumit.

Israeli Premier league

Beitar Jerusalem

In: 

Out:

Bnei Sakhnin

In:

Out:

Bnei Yehuda Tel Aviv

In:

Out:

F.C. Ashdod

In:

Out:

Hapoel Acre

In:

Out:

Hapoel Ashkelon

In:

}

Out:

Hapoel Be'er Sheva

In:

Out:

Hapoel Haifa

In:

Out:

Hapoel Petah Tikva

In:

Out:

Hapoel Ramat Gan

In:

Out:

Hapoel Tel Aviv

In:

Out:

Ironi Kiryat Shmona

In:

Out:

Maccabi Haifa

In:

Out:

Maccabi Netanya

In:

Out:

Maccabi Petah Tikva

In:

Out:

Maccabi Tel Aviv

In:

Out:

Liga Leumit

Ahva Arraba

In:

Out:

Beitar Shimshon Tel Aviv

In:

Out:

Hakoah Amidar Ramat Gan

In:

Out:

Hapoel Bnei Lod

In:

Out:

Hapoel Herzliya

In:

Out:

Hapoel Kfar Saba

In:

Out:

Hapoel Nazareth Illit

In:

Out:

Hapoel Ra'anana

In:

Out:

Ironi Bat Yam

In:

Out:

Ironi Ramat HaSharon

In:

Out:

Hapoel Rishon LeZion

In:

Out:

Maccabi Ahi Nazareth

In:

Out:

Maccabi Be'er Sheva

In:

Out:

Maccabi Herzliya

In:

Out:

Maccabi Ironi Jatt

In:

Out:

Sektzia Nes Tziona

In:

Out:

See also
 2010–11 Toto Cup Al
 2010–11 Toto Cup Leumit
 2010–11 Israel State Cup

Notes and references

Israel
Transfers
2010-11